The Cymothoidae are a family of isopods in the suborder Cymothoida  found in both marine and freshwater environments. Cymoithoids are ectoparasites, usually of fish, and they include the bizarre "tongue-biter" (Cymothoa exigua), which attaches to a fish's tongue, causing it to atrophy, and replaces the tongue with its own body.  Ceratothoa oestroides is one of the most devastating ectoparasites in Mediterranean aquaculture. Around 40 genera and more than 380 species of cymothoid are recognised. Species of the Cymothoidae are generally found in warmer waters and rarely in the cool
and cold climates.

Characteristics
Cymothoids exhibit various adaptations to their parasitic lifestyles. As juveniles, they are not specific in their requirements, and attach themselves temporarily to the skin of any fish. They produce anticoagulants and suck the fish's blood. They detach from their first host and later find another host. When they have found the correct species of fish for their adult development, they attach more permanently. As adults, most species require a particular host species, and are also site-specific. Locations for attachment chosen by different species of parasite include the skin, fins,  gills, and mouth, while some species bore into muscle.

Biology
Cymothoids are protandrous hermaphrodites; each juvenile develops first into a male, but if no females are nearby, the male later becomes a female and attaches permanently to the host. This female is able to secrete pheromones that prevent male cymothoids in the vicinity from becoming female. These parasites can cause serious damage to their hosts, ranging from slow growth rate, through tissue damage and anaemia, to death. Many host fish have mutualistic arrangements with certain shrimps such as Ancylomenes pedersoni, whereby the fish visits a "cleaning station" and the shrimps remove and feed on the cymothoid parasites.

Classification
According to the World Register of Marine Species, the family contains these genera:

Aegathoa Dana, 1853
Agarna Schioedte & Meinert, 1884
Amblycephalon Pillai, 1954
Anilocra Leach, 1818
Anphira Thatcher, 1993
Artystone Schioedte, 1866
Asotana Schioedte & Meinert, 1881
Braga Schioedte & Meinert, 1881
Catoessa Schioedte & Meinert, 1884
Ceratothoa Dana, 1852
Cinusa Schioedte & Meinert, 1884
Creniola Bruce, 1987
Cterissa Schioedte & Meinert, 1884
Cymothoa Fabricius, 1787
Elthusa Schioedte & Meinert, 1884
Emetha Schioedte & Meinert, 1883
Glossobius Schioedte & Meinert, 1883
Ichthyoxenus Herklots, 1870
Idusa Schioedte & Meinert, 1884
Isonebula Taberner, 1977
Joryma Bowman & Tareen, 1983
Kuna Williams & Williams, 1986
Lathraena Schioedte & Meinert, 1881
Livoneca Leach, 1818
Lobothorax Bleeker, 1857
Mothocya Costa in Hope, 1851
Nerocila Leach, 1818
Norileca Bruce, 1990
Olencira Leach, 1818
Ourozeuktes H. Milne-Edwards, 1840
Paracymothoa Lemos de Castro, 1955
Philostomella Szidat & Schubart, 1960
Pleopodias Richardson, 1910
Plotor Schioedte & Meinert, 1881
Pseudoirona Pillai, 1964
Renocila Miers, 1880
Rhiothra Schioedte & Meinert, 1884
Riggia Szidat, 1948
Ryukyua Williams & Bunkley-Williams, 1994
Smenispa Özdikmen, 2009 
Telotha Schioedte & Meinert, 1884
Tetragonocephalon Avdeev, 1978

References

Further reading

External links

Cymothoida
Crustacean families